Dippel is a surname. Notable people with the surname include:

Andreas Dippel (1866–1932), German-born operatic tenor
Johann Konrad Dippel (1673–1734), German pietist theologian, alchemist and physician
Larry Dippel (born c. 1940), American football coach
Leopold Dippel (1827–1914), German botanist

See also
Dippel's oil, (sometimes known as bone oil), a nitrogenous by-product of the destructive distillation of bones
Dipple (disambiguation)